5600 West BRT is a proposed bus rapid transit (BRT) line in western Salt Lake County, Utah, United States, that will be operated by the Utah Transit Authority (UTA) and will run along 5600 West (SR-172). Initially, it will only run along a short segment almost entirely within West Valley City, with a connection to Downtown Salt Lake City. However, it will eventually run from South Jordan to the Salt Lake City International Airport.) It is the fifth of several BRT lines that UTA either either operates or has planned for in Utah County and the Salt Lake Valley. UTA's BRT is described by UTA as "light rail on rubber tires". While it was initially planned for phase 1 of the project to be completed in 2015, the project is currently stalled.

Description
Phase 1 of the 5600 West BRT line will run along a  segment of South 5600 West (SR-172) from 6200 South to 2700 West within Kearns and West Valley City. From the northern end of this segment, it will connect with Downtown Salt Lake City along a route (without any stops) following West 2700 North (Lake Park Boulevard), Bangerter Highway (SR-154), 21st South Freeway (SR-201), and Interstate 15 (I-15). The initial route is projected to include 6 stops and run at 10-15 minute intervals and cost $100 million. UTA had anticipated having Phase 1 of the 5600 West BRT operational by the end of 2015.

Phase 2 will also include connections to four TRAX stations: the Airport station on the Green Line and the 5600 West Old Bingham Highway, South Jordan Parkway, and Daybreak Parkway stations on the Red Line. Phase 2 was originally estimated to be completed sometime before 2025. Phase 3 calls for the eventual replacement of this BRT line with a TRAX light rail line along the entire Phase 2 corridor. There is no estimated completion date for Phase 3, except that it will not be until after Phase 2.

History
In 2010, while expressing their support for the 5600 West BRT, West Valley City indicated that they do not ever foresee the need for a light rail line along South 5600 West. Of particular concern was UTA's plans to secure the additional right of way necessary for a future TRAX line. UTA responded to the objections by indicating that the TRAX line may not be built for several decades, but added that "It's always better to overplan and underconstruct than the other way around."

At one point in the development stages, an additional stop further south in Herriman was planned. However, by 2013 this stop had been dropped from the plans.

Route 
UTA has not yet assigned a route number to the 5600 West BRT.

Kearns
The initial route will begin with a stop at 6200 South (Bennion Boulevard/SR-173) on South 5600 West on the southern edge of Kearns. (This point is also the southern terminus of State Route-172.) A Park and Ride lot is planned in the area of this stop. From this stop it will head north along South 5600 West, crossing Lodestone Avenue (at about 6000 South) and West 5655 South (Plumbago Avenue/Vista Ridge Way), until it enters West Valley City.

West Valley City
Just after entering West Valley City the 5600 West BRT will reach the 5400 South stop at about 5400 South. Another Park and Ride lot is planned for the area of this stop as well. After crossing West 5400 South (SR-173), it will continue north along South 5600 West and will cross West 5200 South (Henley Drive/Westridge Boulevard), West 5100 South (Mountain Men Drive), West 4970 South (South Garden Ridge Road), and West 4700 South before arriving at the 4700 South stop. Continuing on along South 5400 West it will cross West 4470 South (Chantry Way), West 4420 South (Deercrest Drive), West 4360 South, before passing in front of Hunter High School and crossing over the Utah and Salt Lake Canal.

Just north of the canal the 5600 West BRT will cross West 4100 South and then continue north to West 3500 South (SR-171) and the 3500 South stop. The 3500 South stop was to include a connection with the (now discontinued) 3500 South MAX and is anticipated to include as Park and Ride lot as well. After crossing West 3500 South it will continue north along 5600 West and will cross West 3100 South before reaching West 2700 South (Parkway Boulevard/Lake Park Boulevard) and the 2700 South stop. This stop is also anticipated to include a Park and Ride lot. While Phase 2 of the 5600 West MAX will have the 5600 West BRT continue north from this point (along South 5600 West), Phase 1 will have it turning east along West 2700 South (Lake Park Boulevard). (In Phase 1, the 2700 South stop will be the last one along the route until it reaches Downtown Salt Lake City.)

Heading east along West 2700 South, the 5600 West MAX will cross High Commons Drive before reaching the roundabout with Dabury Drive. East of the roundabout the route follows Lake Park Boulevard as it jogs slightly to the north before continuing east again, after another roundabout with South 5370 West.  Continuing its course to the east the route follows the road as it passes through roundabouts with Highbury Parkway and South 4800 West (Corporate Park Drive) before it reaches about 4060 West. At this point Lake Park Boulevard curves to the north and then to the east again at 2400 South until it reaches Bangerter Highway SR 154. At Bangerter Highway, the 5600 West MAX will turn north to cross West 2100 South before reaching the 21st South Freeway (Utah State Route 201) and entering Salt Lake City.

Salt Lake City
After the 5600 West BRT enters Salt Lake City, it will head east on the 21st South Freeway, crossing over South 3230 West, Interstate 215, Redwood Road (South 1700 West/SR-68), and South 900 West before it reaches Interestate 15  (I-15) at the Spaghetti Bowl. Upon reaching I-15, it will head north along this freeway, crossing West 2100 South, West 1700 South, West 1300 South, Fayette Avenue, West 900 South, and West 800 South, until it exits I-15 at 400 South (University Boulevard).

After heading east on West 400 South, the route of the 5600 West BRT is a little unclear. UTA's map appears to indicate that it will continue east as far as 300 West (US-89), crossing South 800 West, crossing over South 700 West and South 600 West, and then crossing South 500 West and South 400 West, but where its stop will be is unclear. Being in such close proximity to the Salt Lake Intermodal Hub, it may well somehow connect with that station, but so far UTA has not provided sufficient clarification.

Stops
Initially six stops are planned for the 5600 West BRT. The stops indicated are based upon the best information available so far and are subject to change before the project is finalized. All stops in Phase 1, except the one in Downtown Salt Lake City, will are anticipated to be built in the center of South 5600 West.

Future stops
In Phase 2, eleven additional stops/stations are planned. Six of the planned stops will be in Salt Lake City (to the north of the initial corridor) and will connect with the Salt Lake City International Airport and the TRAX Green Line. The other five planned stops will stretch across several cities (to the south of the initial corridor), as far south as Herriman, and will connect with the TRAX Red Line.

See also

 Mountain View Corridor
 Utah Transit Authority Bus Rapid Transit

Notes

References

External links
 Official UTA website

Bus rapid transit in Utah